Wangki may refer to:
Wangki Radio, a radio station in Fitzroy Crossing, Western Australia
Wangki Lowang, Indian politician